Kalamb may refer to the following entities associated with Maharashtra, India:
 Kalamb, Osmanabad, a town in Osmanabad District
 Kalamb Tahsil
 Kalamb Beach, a beach near Mumbai
 Kalamb, Ambegaon, a village in Pune District 
 , a village in Karjat Taluka,  Raigad District
 Kalamb, Yavatmal, a village in Yavatmal District
 Neolamarckia cadamba, a tree known in Marathi as "kalamb"

See also 
 Kala Amb, a town in Himachal Pradesh